Guy H. Sturgis (March 3, 1877 – January 18, 1951) of Portland, Maine, was a long-serving Justice of the Maine Supreme Judicial Court from August 13, 1923, to March 8, 1949, serving as Chief Justice after August 8, 1940.

Born in New Gloucester, Maine, Sturgis was " educated in the town's common schools, and graduated from Bowdoin College in 1898. He received a law degree from Columbia University Law School in 1899, and studied law at the office of Thomas B. Reed". Sturgis served as Maine Attorney General from 1917 to 1920.

References

Justices of the Maine Supreme Judicial Court
Lawyers from Portland, Maine
People from New Gloucester, Maine
Bowdoin College alumni
Columbia Law School alumni
1877 births
1951 deaths